Naqoura (Enn Nâqoura, Naqoura, An Nāqūrah) is a small city in southern Lebanon. Since March 23, 1978, the United Nations Interim Force in Lebanon (UNIFIL) has been headquartered in Naqoura.

Name
According to E. H. Palmer (1881), the name  means "the horn" or "the trumpet". This name rises apparently from a misconception on the part of the Arab-speaking inhabitants, as the name, [..] Tyre means in Arabic a horn or trumpet; therefore Ras Sur (the headland or ladder of Tyre') is rendered by Nakura, the synonym for Sur. The word is also connected with [..] to peck or perforate."

History

In 1875, during the late Ottoman era, Victor Guérin  described it: "The village stands upon a hill, on the south of which is a deep way, through which flows a spring called 'Ain Nakurah, which waters plantations of fig-trees and olives mixed with palms. The village contains 400 Metawileh. The houses are modern, but some of the materials appear ancient by their regularity and dimensions. There must, therefore, have  been an older village here, the name of which was probably similar, if not identical." According to Guérin, the place is associated with the historic Ladder of the Tyrians (Scala Tyriorum).

In 1881, the PEF's Survey of Western Palestine (SWP) described it: "A village, built of stone, containing about 250 Moslems, situated on low hills by sea-coast. Gardens of olives, palms, pomegranates, figs, and arable land ; brushwood to the east. Two springs with plentiful supply of water."

In 1978 UNIFIL established its headquarters around the former toll station beside Naqoura. Some of the buildings marked the end of the Lebanese section of the Beirut-Haifa railway which had been closed since Jewish forces blew up the tunnel into Palestine in 1948.

Following the 1982 invasion Nakoura became part of the Israeli Security Zone. In November 1983 Israeli and Lebanese officials began a series of meetings in the UN headquarters in Naqoura to negotiate an Israeli withdrawal.

In the autumn of 1986 Lahad’s South Lebanon Army constructed a small port in Nakoura from which a ferry connected to Jounieh, north of Beirut. On 3 September 1991 a Swedish soldier serving with UNIFIL, was killed when he was caught in a shootout between Palestinians and SLA gunmen in Naqoura.
Twelve days later, 15 September, another Swedish soldier was killed and five Swedish and French soldiers were wounded when Palestinian gunmen intending to carry out an attack on the Israeli city of Nahariya en route to their target by boat mistakenly landed in Naqoura and confronted UNIFIL troops. One of the gunmen was also killed and another injured.

References

Bibliography

External links
 Naqoura, Localiban
Survey of Western Palestine, Map 3:  IAA, Wikimedia commons 

Populated places in the Israeli security zone 1985–2000
Israel–Lebanon relations
Populated places in Tyre District
Shia Muslim communities in Lebanon